The Cassidulinacea is a superfamily of benthic amoeboid foraminifera in the order Rotaliida that has been extant from the Paleocene down to the present. Tests are composed of secreted, optically radial or granular, perforate calcite with chambers biserially coiled at least in the early part, Apertures are usually an interiomarginal slit, but may become terminal and may have secondary features.

Cassidulinacea is included in the suborder Rotaliina by Loeblich and Tappan, e.g. 1964 and 1988, since redefined as the Rotaliida  and since reassigned to the Buliminida in Sen Gupta 2002. Two families are included. They are the:
Cassidulindae, and
Cassidulinitidae

The Cassidulinidae, which has a range from the Paleocene to the present, includes most of the genera. The Cassidulinitidae which includes only Cassidulinita is restricted to the Pliocene.

References

Further reading
 A. R. Loeblich and H. Tappan, 1964. Sarcodina Chiefly "Thecamoebians" and Foraminiferida; Treatise on Invertebrate Paleontology, Part C Protista 2. Geological Society of America and University of Kansas Press.
 A. R. Loeblich & H.Tappan,1988.Forminiferal Genera and their Classification GSI E-book

Foraminifera superfamilies
Rotaliida